Climbing High is a 1938 British comedy film directed by Carol Reed and produced by Michael Balcon with a screenplay by Sonnie Hale, Marion Dix and Lesser Samuels. It stars Jessie Matthews, Michael Redgrave, Noel Madison, Margaret Vyner and Alistair Sim, and was first released in the U.K. in November 1938.

Plot
Nicky Brooke (Michael Redgrave) a wealthy young man who despite his engagement to the aristocratic (and broke) Lady Constance Westaker (Margaret Vyner) falls for hard-up model Diana Castles (Jessie Matthews) after nearly running her over with his car. In an effort to distance himself from 'tabloid' created tales of his playboy lifestyle, he changes his name and attempts to woo Diana by pretending to be poor.

Cast

Jessie Matthews as Diana Castles
Michael Redgrave as Nicky Brooke
Noel Madison as Gibson
Alastair Sim as Max
Margaret Vyner as Lady Constance Westaker
Mary Clare as Lady Emily Westaker
Francis L. Sullivan as Madman
Enid Stamp-Taylor as Winnie
Torin Thatcher as Jim Castle
Tucker McGuire as Patsey
Basil Radford as Reggie Baird
Athole Stewart as Uncle
Kathleen Byron as model
Terry-Thomas as voice of cow
Leslie Phillips as a child actor.

Production
Climbing High was filmed at Pinewood Studios, Iver Heath, Buckinghamshire by Gaumont British Picture Corporation.

Reception
Writing for Allmovie, Bruce Eder considered Climbing High to be one of Jessie Matthews' best vehicles which he noted was "a surprising result considering it is devoid of the musical numbers that one would have expected from one of England's top dancing and singing talents of the period. What it has is a brilliantly piercing witty script ... superbly engaging acting performances by all concerned and superb pacing." Eder further noted that "Carol Reed was only 3 years into his career ... and was already one of the top comedy directors in England." He concluded that Climbing High was "one of the most entertaining British comedies of the period with some piercing topical humour (especially about the advertising business and political activism) that still holds today."

References

External links
 

1938 films
Films directed by Carol Reed
1938 comedy films
British comedy films
Films shot at Pinewood Studios
British black-and-white films
Films with screenplays by Lesser Samuels
1930s English-language films
1930s British films